Peta or PETA may refer to:

Acronym 
 Pembela Tanah Air, a militia established by the occupying Japanese in Indonesia in 1943
 People for the Ethical Treatment of Animals, an American animal rights organization
 People Eating Tasty Animals, an organization mocking the People for the Ethical Treatment of Animals' stance on vegetarianism
 Philippine Educational Theater Association, a Philippine theatrical association
 Pulse Ejector Thrust Augmentor, a type of jet engine

People 
 Peta (given name), including a list of people and fictional characters with the name
 Tomasz Peta (born 1951), Roman Catholic Archbishop of the Metropolitan Archdiocese of Saint Mary in Astana, Kazakhstan

Places 
 Peta, Greece, a town
 Peţa River, a river in Romania

Other uses 
 peta-, a metric prefix denoting a factor of 1015
 Battle of Peta
 Peta (cat), the unofficial Chief Mouser to the UK Cabinet Office 1964-78
 Mysore peta, a type of Indian royal attire
 Pentaerythritol tetraacrylate, an organic chemical

See also
 Petta (disambiguation)
 Pettah (disambiguation)
 Pita (disambiguation)